The year 2003 is the 2nd year in the history of the Cage Rage Championships, a mixed martial arts promotion based in the United Kingdom. In 2003 Cage Rage Championships held 3 events, Cage Rage 2.

Title fights

Events list

Cage Rage 2

Cage Rage 2 was an event held on February 22, 2003 at York Hall, Bethnal Green in London, United Kingdom.

Results

Cage Rage 3

Cage Rage 3 was an event held on June 8, 2003 at Caesar's Nightclub in Streatham, United Kingdom.

Results

Cage Rage 4

Cage Rage 4 was an event held on October 12, 2003 at Caesar's Nightclub in Streatham, United Kingdom.

Results

See also 
 Cage Rage Championships
 List of Cage Rage champions
 List of Cage Rage events

References

Cage Rage Championships events
2003 in mixed martial arts